Johann Blank (April 17, 1904 – March 15, 1983) was a German water polo player who competed in the 1928 Summer Olympics.

He was part of the German team which won the gold medal. He played one match as goalkeeper.

See also
 Germany men's Olympic water polo team records and statistics
 List of Olympic champions in men's water polo
 List of Olympic medalists in water polo (men)
 List of men's Olympic water polo tournament goalkeepers

External links
 

1904 births
1983 deaths
German male water polo players
Water polo goalkeepers
Water polo players at the 1928 Summer Olympics
Olympic water polo players of Germany
Olympic gold medalists for Germany
Olympic medalists in water polo
Medalists at the 1928 Summer Olympics